Mi querido capitán ("My Dear Captain") is a 1950 Mexican film. It stars Sara García.

Cast
 Fernando Soler – Don Gastón Garza y Garza
 Sara García – Pelancha
 Rosita Quintana – Rosita
 Felipe de Alba – Fernando
 Agustín Isunza – Homero
 Jorge Reyes – Don Carlos 
  – Octaviano
 Luis Badillo – Monchito, el yucateco
 Eugenia Galindo – Esposa de Guadalajara
 Nicolás Rodríguez – Don Julio
 Antonio Bravo – Esposo de Guadalajara
 Sonia Arriola – 
 Bertha Lehar – Maruja,  de Rosita
 Guillermina Téllez Girón – Amiga de Monchito	 
 Gloria Mange		 
 Leonor Gómez – Estefana

External links
 

1950 films
1950s Spanish-language films
Mexican comedy-drama films
1950 comedy-drama films
Mexican black-and-white films
1950s Mexican films